Stephanie Samedy (born September 27, 1998) is an American professional volleyball player who plays as a opposite hitter for Italian Series A1 team Imoco Volley Conegliano. She played collegiately at the University of Minnesota.

Personal life

Samedy is from Clermont, Florida and played volleyball at her high school, East Ridge. She was the first volleyball athlete in her high school's history to sign with a NCAA Division I program when she signed with Minnesota.  She was named an Under Armour All-American and was the 2016-17 Florida Gatorade Volleyball Player of the Year, recording 424 kills, 189 digs, and 25 blocks during her senior year. She played on the youth and junior USA national teams, and won a silver medal at the 2015 FIVB Volleyball Girls' U18 World Championship.

Career

College

Samedy became the first player in Minnesota's history to earn AVCA First Team All-American honors as a freshman. In her freshman season, she led the team with 478 kills. In her sophomore season, she was again selected as a First Team All-American, and again led the team with 359 kills. As a junior, she was named a second team All-American and led the team with 353 kills. She ended her career as a five time AVCA All-American at the University of Minnesota. She was eligible to receive the award five time due to the extra year of eligibility granted by the NCAA due to the COVID-19 pandemic. She is one of only two five time All-Americans in NCAA history. Samedy helped Minnesota to a conference championship in 2018 and an NCAA Final Four appearance in 2019.

She was named the Big Ten Player of the Year in 2020 and 2021. She finished her career as only the second player in conference history to surpass 2,000 kills and 1,500 digs. She was named First Team All-Big Ten all five seasons, one of only two players in conference history to do so.

Professional clubs

  SSC Palmberg Schwerin (2021–2022)
  Bartoccini Fortinfissi Perugia (it) (2022)
  Imoco Volley Conegliano

Awards and honors

Clubs

 2021–2022 German Super Cup –  Silver medal, with SSC Palmberg Schwerin.

College

AVCA All-American (First Team in 2017, 2018, 2020, and 2021; Second Team in 2019)
Big Ten Player of the Year (2020, 2021)
Senior CLASS Award winner in volleyball (2020)
Five Time First Team All-Big Ten (2017–2021)

External links
Minnesota Bio

References

1998 births
Living people
Sportspeople from Florida
People from Clermont, Florida
Opposite hitters
American women's volleyball players
Minnesota Golden Gophers women's volleyball players
American expatriate sportspeople in Germany
American expatriate sportspeople in Italy
Expatriate volleyball players in Germany
Expatriate volleyball players in Italy
Serie A1 (women's volleyball) players